Clarence Styvar is an American politician and a Republican member of the Wyoming House of Representatives representing District 12 since January 8, 2019.

Elections

2016
When incumbent Republican Representative Harlan Edmonds retired, Styvar announced his candidacy. Styvar was defeated by Lars Lone in the Republican primary.

2018
When incumbent Republican Representative Lars Lone retired, Styvar announced his candidacy. Styvar defeated Connie Czarnecki in the Republican primary with 56% of the vote. After the primary, Lone announced his resignation after moving outside the district, and Laramie County Commissioners appointed Styvar to the seat, having won the primary. He defeated Democratic candidate Ryan Lindsey with 55.9%% of the vote.

References

External links
Official page at the Wyoming Legislature
Profile from Ballotpedia

Living people
Republican Party members of the Wyoming House of Representatives
People from Cheyenne, Wyoming
21st-century American politicians
Year of birth missing (living people)